Eupithecia tetraglena is a moth in the family Geometridae. It is found in Kenya.

Subspecies
Eupithecia tetraglena tetraglena
Eupithecia tetraglena amplior D. S. Fletcher, 1958

References

Endemic moths of Kenya
Moths described in 1932
tetraglena
Moths of Africa